Antonino Faà di Bruno (15 December 1910 – 2 May 1981) was an Italian actor and former military officer.

Biography 
A member of the aristocratic Faà di Bruno family, Antonino Faà di Bruno was born in London, the son of Marchese Alessandro Faà di Bruno (who was the Italian consul in London at that time) and of his wife Fanny Costì. He was named after his namesake ancestor, Antonino Faà di Bruno (1762–1829), who was Bishop of Asti in the 19th century.

He took up a military career, becoming a lieutenant in the grenadiers and fighting in Italian East Africa. After his retirement in 1964, with the rank of Brigadier General, Faà di Bruno started a career as an actor, working with Carlo Lizzani (La vita agra), Pier Paolo Pasolini (Pigsty), Vittorio De Sica (Lo chiameremo Andrea), Billy Wilder (Avanti!), Federico Fellini (Amarcord), Luciano Salce (Alla mia cara mamma nel giorno del suo compleanno), Mario Monicelli (We Want the Colonels).

He performed as a character actor in several commedia all'italiana films, and became known for playing the role of retired Lt.Col. Vittorio Emanuele Ribaud, who attempted a coup d'état in We Want the Colonels, and of the Duke-Count Piercarlo Semenzara in Il secondo tragico Fantozzi.

Personal life and death 
In 1947, he married the widow of his cousin Emilio Faà di Bruno who had died in 1943, Anna Maria Andreini. He later adopted their daughters, Camilla and Costanza.

Away from his public life, he enjoyed dwelling in the countryside of Istia d'Ombrone.

He died at 70 following complications from a traumatic brain injury that he suffered after being hit by a bus.

Filmography

References

External links 
 

1910 births
1981 deaths
Italian male actors
Italian military personnel
20th-century Italian male actors
20th-century Italian military personnel
Italian expatriates in the United Kingdom
Road incident deaths in Italy
Deaths from head injury